Bryski  is a village in the administrative district of Gmina Góra Świętej Małgorzaty, within Łęczyca County, Łódź Voivodeship, in central Poland.

References

See also 
 Collegiate Church of St. Mary and St. Alexius, Tum

Villages in Łęczyca County